Burlew is a surname. Notable people with the surname include:

Fred Burlew (1871–1927), American horse trainer
Rich Burlew (born 1974), American writer, game designer, and graphic designer